Magnus Aasbrenn (born 10 November 1973) is a retired Norwegian football defender.

He started his career in Fu/Vo, and after a time in Lillestrøm's youth setup he was promoted to the first team in 1994. From 1995 to 1999 he played for Lyn, bagging 23 games in the 1997 Norwegian Premier League.

References

1973 births
Living people
Norwegian footballers
People from Nes, Akershus
Lillestrøm SK players
Lyn Fotball players
Eliteserien players
Norwegian First Division players
Association football defenders
Sportspeople from Viken (county)